Ilsley  Silias Boone (18791968) was a charismatic speaker, a powerful organizer, a magazine publisher and the founding father of the American Sunbathing Association (ASA)later reorganized as the American Association for Nude Recreation (AANR). As a publisher he distributed the first nudist magazine in the United States. That publication eventually led to a challenge to the U.S. Postal Service's ban against sending obscene materials through the mail. Boone took his challenge all the way to the U.S. Supreme Court which struck down the ban.

Early life 
Ilsley was born to Silas Ilsley Boone (18461900) and Agnes Ferris Turnbull Eldridge (18491940) in Brooklyn, New York in 1879. Little is known of Boone's early life, other than that he lived in Brooklyn with his two brothers and two sisters. In 1904 he graduated from Brown University and married Alice M. Barragar. Together they had two children: a daughter, Agnes Margaret Boone, and a son, Frederick Eldredge Boone. They soon moved to Newton, Massachusetts where he obtained a divinity degree from Newton Theological Institute. Originally ordained as a Baptist, he served as the pastor of the Baptist church in Ipswich, Massachusetts, serving from October, 1904, to August, 1907. In 1921 Boone became pastor of the Ponds Reformed Church (Dutch Reformed) in Oakland, New Jersey. In the mid-1920s, he developed the concept of visual education under contract with the New York City Public School System. With the onset of the Great Depression, the city canceled Boone's contract, but his interest in education continued, serving with the Oakland Public School system. During this period he divorced his first wife and married his paternal first cousin, Ella Murray "Mae" Boone. They had three children: Bradford Ilsley Boone, Nancy Adeline Boone, and Berton Maxfield Boone.

Nudist activism 
In 1930 Kurt Barthel had formed The American League for Physical Culture (ALPC), America's first nudist organization. The following year Boone became interested in naturism and was appointed as the ALPC Executive Secretary. Soon after, Barthel asked him to take his place as President of the ALPC, the position which Boone held for 20 years until August, 1952. (The organization was by then called The American Sunbathing Association.) He traveled to Germany in the early 1930s to visit Freilichtpark (Free-Light Park) near Hamburg, the world's first naturist resort, which had opened nearly three decades earlier. During this time he also became a member of both the New York and Royal Microscopy Societies.

In 1936 Boone opened "Sunshine Park" in the Mays Landing section of Hamilton Township, New Jersey (near Atlantic City), and established the national headquarters of the American Sunbathing Association there. As a faithful adherent to Barthel's original ideals and behavior guidelines, "Uncle Danny" advocated the development of new nudist clubs, often leading legal challenges fighting local officials trying to block nudist centers in their area. He encouraged regimens of calisthenics, abstinence (alcohol), complete nudity regardless of the weather, and vegetarianism for all members and their guests. This was in addition to his overall beliefs of healthful benefits derived from the combination of nudity, sunbathing, and exercise. In 1965 the park was purchased by psychologist Oliver York for $120,000. It continued for another two decades until health violations of the aging buildings forced its closure by the city.

Later years 
Boone's second wife died in 1960 and he became a widower for the last eight years of his life. Due to the proliferation of more successful competing nudist and adult publications, his Sunshine Publishing Company went out of business in 1963. Nearly broke, Boone lived his last years in the home of National Nudist Council member Edith Church, where he died on Thanksgiving Day, 1968, in Whitehouse, Ohio. at age 89. His magazine Sunshine & Health continued under another publisher into the 1980s, making it the longest published nudist magazine in America.

Publications 
Following his ordination, Boone served a number of pastorates and wrote a number of books dealing with the divine, the most  notable being The Conquering Christ. By 1933, however, Boone's interest in nudism led to publishing the first American nudist magazine, The Nudist (with Henry S. Huntington as its editor) which later became Sunshine & Health, published by his Sunshine Publishing Company. Even with the genitalia airbrushed out of the photos of nudists, the United States Postal Service decided the materials were obscene and could not be distributed through the U.S. mail. Boone challenged the decision and took his case all the way to the United States Supreme Court.

In 1958, he ultimately won the right to distribute uncensored nudist materials through the mail. The victory enabled not only legitimate nudist magazines and men's magazines to feature full frontal nudity (including Hugh Hefner's Playboy Magazine), but also unintentionally helped make possible the later oncoming flood of explicit adult publications during the 1960s sexual revolution.

Books

Periodicals 
 College Hill Verse: Being selections from student publications of Brown University 1894-1904 (editor, 1904)
 The Nudist (later known as Sunshine & Health) (1933-1963)

See also 
 Christian naturism
 Clothes free organizations
 Naturism
 Public nudity
 Skinny dipping

Notes

References

Further reading 
 
 

1879 births
1968 deaths
American activists
American naturists
People from Hamilton Township, Atlantic County, New Jersey
Social nudity advocates
Brown University alumni